Shirur Assembly constituency is one of the Vidhan Sabha (legislative assembly) constituencies of Maharashtra state, western India. This constituency is located in Pune district, and it is a segment of Shirur (Lok Sabha constituency).

Geographical scope
The constituency comprises revenue circles Nhavare, Wadgaon Rasai
and Talegaon Dhamdhere, Shirur Saja and Karanjawane Saja of
Shirur revenue circle and Shirur Municipal council all belonging to Shirur taluka and revenue circles Wagholi and Urali Kanchan belonging to Haveli taluka.

Members of Vidhan Sabha

References

Assembly constituencies of Pune district
Assembly constituencies of Maharashtra